Henriëtte is a Dutch version of the feminine given name Henrietta. The diaeresis is sometimes omitted in foreign texts. People with the name include:

Henriëtte Amalia of Anhalt-Dessau (1666–1726), mother of John William Friso, Prince of Orange
Henriëtte Bosmans (1895–1952), Dutch composer
Aletta Henriëtte Jacobs (1854–1929), Dutch physician and women's suffrage activist
Henriëtte Geertruida Knip (1783–1842), Dutch flower painter
Henriëtte van Lynden-Leijten (1950–2010), Dutch diplomat
Louise Henriëtte van Nassau (1627–1667), daughter of Frederick Henry, Prince of Orange
Henriëtte Gesina Numans (1877–1955), Dutch painter
Henriëtte Catharina van Oranje (1637–1708), daughter of Frederick Henry, Prince of Orange
Henriëtte d'Oultremont de Wégimont (1792–1864), second, morganatic wife of the first Dutch king, William I
Henriëtte Roland Holst (1869–1952), Dutch poet and socialist
Henriëtte Ronner-Knip (1821–1909), Dutch-Belgian animal painter
Henriëtte Roosenburg (1916–1972), Dutch journalist and political prisoner
Henriëtte Elisabeth de Swart (born 1961), Dutch linguist
Henriëtte Weersing (born 1965), Dutch volleyball player
Henriëtte Willebeek le Mair (1889–1966), Dutch illustrator of children's books
Henriëtte Wolters-van Pee (1692–1741), Dutch miniature painter

Henriette